Amrita Cheema is an Indian journalist. She has been working since 1999 as a news presenter with the German international TV broadcaster Deutsche Welle-TV. From 2005 to 2008, she spent some years with the Australian broadcaster SBS Television.

Cheema is a Rhodes Scholar with a D.Phil. in Modern History from the University of Oxford in 1988. She went to Britain after obtaining a first class B.A. and M.A. degree from St. Stephen's College, Delhi. She taught nineteenth century German history at the University of Maryland in Bonn before joining Radio Deutsche Welle's English Service in Cologne.

Career 
Cheema was an editor and anchor of Star News Sunday in Delhi. This 60-minute programme with investigative reports and live interviews had the highest television rating points for a news and current affairs show in the country. She also anchored prime time Star News English bulletins, Newshour and election specials. In 1994, she was part of a team which launched India's first news and current affairs television channel Television International (TVI), under the Business India TV umbrella.

Cheema moved to Berlin in 1998 to become one of the hosts of the German international broadcasters Deutsche Welle English language edition of the Journal, their television news program. She also produced People and Politics and European Journal. In 2000, she worked on the DW-TV's documentary The Truth Is in No Hurry.

As a journalist, she has interviewed world leaders, dissidents, and newsmakers.

Cheema had lived in Europe for more than sixteen years.

In 2005, Cheema moved to Sydney, Australia and began working for the public multicultural television network SBS Television on World News Australia, where she co-hosted the  bulletin with Anton Enus on weekdays.

In 2008, Cheema resigned from SBS, and read her final bulletin on 6 June 2008. She since has returned to Deutsche Welle in Germany.

References

External links
 Amrita Cheema profile at DW-TV
 Amrita Cheema profile at SBS

20th-century Indian journalists
Indian women television journalists
Indian television journalists
Indian Sikhs
Year of birth missing (living people)
Living people
Punjabi people
Alumni of Exeter College, Oxford
Indian expatriates in Australia
Indian expatriates in Germany
Indian investigative journalists
21st-century Indian women writers
21st-century Indian writers
21st-century Indian journalists
20th-century Indian women writers
Indian editors
Indian women editors